Willem Gerhard Janssen  (11 June 1880 – 8 September 1976) was a Dutch footballer. He was part of the Netherlands national football team, playing 3 matches. He played his first match on 1 April 1907.

References

1880 births
1976 deaths
Dutch footballers
Netherlands international footballers
Footballers from Enschede
Association football defenders